Liam Jamie Cullen (born 23 April 1999) is a Welsh professional footballer who plays as a forward for Swansea City. He is a Wales Under-21 international.

Career
Cullen joined the Swansea City academy at the age of 8, making his debut for the under-18 side at the age of 13.
On 28 August 2018, he made his senior debut as a substitute in 1–0 loss to Crystal Palace in the EFL Cup. He scored his first goal for the club in a 4–1 win against Reading on 22 July 2020, a result which secured them a play-off spot. On 13 January 2022, he joined Lincoln City on loan for the remainder of the season. He would make an immediate debut, starting the EFL League One game against Cambridge United on 15 January 2022. His first goal for Lincoln would come against Wycombe Wanderers on 12 February.

International career
Having previously played for Wales at under-17, under-19 and under-20 level, Cullen made his debut at under-21 on 12 October 2018, playing 62 minutes in a 2–0 loss to Romania.

Career statistics

References

1999 births
Living people
Sportspeople from Pembrokeshire
Welsh footballers
Swansea City A.F.C. players
Lincoln City F.C. players
Wales youth international footballers
Association football forwards
English Football League players